Australian Industry Trade College (AITC) - RTO 31775, is an independent, senior school for Young People located in Robina, Cleveland and the Sunshine Coast in Queensland, Australia. Students in Years 10, 11 and 12 undertake school-based apprenticeships or traineeships which include paid work placements and the opportunity to complete vocational education training (VET studies) in the student's chosen area.

Established in 2008 by industry leaders, AITC is one of only two Trade Colleges (or vocational schools) in Queensland and one of four in Australia. The purpose built campus on Scottsdale Drive, Robina officially opened on 6 April 2011. AITC is a not for profit company governed by a Board of Directors appointed from a broad range of industries. The school has a selective enrolment policy and currently caters for approximately 380 students for Year 10, 11 and Year 12 in Robina and 180 students in Cleveland.

The Federal Member for McPherson, the Honorable Karen Andrews, said in The House of Representatives on 17 August 2011 "The AITC also has a unique style of teaching and working with students".

AITC is a Queensland registered senior college which offers approved courses leading to the award of the Queensland Certificate of Education (QCE). The AITC is also a Registered Training Organisation (RTO), governed by the Australian Skills Quality Authority (ASQA) which is the responsibility of the Minister for Industry and Innovation.

History
The Australian Industry Trade College began operating in 2008 prior to the demise of the 24 Government funded Australian Technical Colleges (vocational education institutions) which officially ceased to operate in December 2009.

Previously a technical college, AITC became a school with an employment arm that secured training partnerships through Registered Training Organisations (RTO's) to deliver its trade training. According to CEO, Mark Hands, in essence the college became “An Independent Senior School with a Trade Focus”. At the 5th International Conference on e-Learning in Malaysia, Hands delivered a paper on the College's model of hybrid learning.  The College has close working relationships with industry organizations including TAFE Qld, Master Plumbers Queensland, Master Builders Australia, and major Australian Apprenticeships Centers such as Busy at Work Apprenticeship Services who are major sponsors of the college.

AITC is an educational provider that gives industry the capacity to influence the required outcomes of educated apprentices and trainees. College students are encouraged to participate in international construction projects with a team travelling to Cambodia in September 2013 and 2015 to build homes and shelter for underprivileged Cambodians.

Curriculum

AITC students attend the College in 5 week blocks and are placed in work experience for 5 – 7 weeks during the remainder of the school term. Students complete study modules in English, Math, Business and Information Technology. Students begin an apprenticeship or traineeship under the School-based Apprenticeships & Traineeships (SATs) scheme which is administered by the Queensland Government.  At the completion of their three years at the AITC, students with up to one third of their apprenticeship already completed, typically convert their SATs into a full-time apprenticeship. The curriculum at this school is one of the best in the college, always focusing on real life and not just grades although they do grade with A,B,C,D,E it is not the most important this.

AITC is both a Senior School and a Registered Training Organization (RTO) and as such has an Australian Qualifications Framework (AQF) qualification and meets the training delivery requirements of the Australian Quality Training Framework (AQTF).

The AITC offers over 600 apprenticeships and traineeships and in particular construction, hospitality, engineering, automotive and hairdressing.

Student awards
Queensland Master Builders Apprentice of the Year 
Construction Skills Queensland Apprentice of the Year
Master Plumbers School-based Apprentice of the Year 
Queensland Training Awards Regional Finalist
Australian Defence Force Long Tan Leadership Awards 
Australian Student Vocational Prize Winners

References

External links
http://www.aitc.qld.edu.au/ AITC Australian Industry Trade College website
https://www.facebook.com/AustralianIndustryTradeCollege AITC Australian Industry Trade College on Facebook
https://twitter.com/AITC_Robina AITC Australian Industry Trade College on Twitter
https://www.youtube.com/user/aitcrobina AITC Australian Industry Trade College on YouTube

Schools in Queensland
Educational institutions established in 2008
2008 establishments in Australia
Vocational education in Australia